Gregg Park is a historic public park and national historic district located at Vincennes, Knox County, Indiana. The park was dedicated in 1931, and developed by the Works Progress Administration (WPA) in 1938–1939.  The WPA constructed a limestone shelterhouse, concrete Moderne style bandshell / grandstand, the brick main entrance gate, and horseshoe pits.  The park is named for Vincennes mayor Claude E. Gregg (1885-1931) and is a popular spot for swimming.

It was added to the National Register of Historic Places in 2013.

References

Works Progress Administration in Indiana
Historic districts on the National Register of Historic Places in Indiana
1931 establishments in Indiana
Historic districts in Knox County, Indiana
National Register of Historic Places in Knox County, Indiana